Anna, Comtesse Mathieu de Noailles (Anna Elisabeth Bibesco-Bassaraba de Brancovan) (15 November 1876 – 30 April 1933) was a French writer of Romanian and Greek descent, a poet and a socialist feminist.

Biography

Personal life
Born Princess Anna Elisabeth Bibesco-Bassaraba de Brancovan in Paris, she was a descendant of the Bibescu and Craioveşti families of Romanian boyars. Her father was Prince Grégoire Bibesco-Bassaraba, a son of Wallachian Prince Gheorghe Bibesco and Zoe Mavrocordato-Bassaraba de Brancovan. Her Greek mother was the former Ralouka (Rachel) Mussurus, a musician, to whom the Polish composer Ignacy Paderewski dedicated several of his compositions. Via her mother, Anna de Noailles was a great-great-granddaughter of Sophronius of Vratsa, one of the leading figures of the Bulgarian National Revival, through his grandson Stefan Bogoridi, caimacam of Moldavia.

In 1897 she married Mathieu Fernand Frédéric Pascal de Noailles (1873–1942), the fourth son of the 7th Duke de Noailles. The couple soon became the toast of Parisian high society. They had one child, a son, Count Anne-Jules de Noailles (1900–1979).

Career
Anna de Noailles wrote three novels, an autobiography, and many collections of poetry. She had friendly relations with the intellectual, literary and artistic elite of the day including Marcel Proust, Francis Jammes, Colette, André Gide, Frédéric Mistral, Robert de Montesquiou-Fezensac, Rainer Maria Rilke, Paul Valéry, Jean Cocteau, Pierre Loti, Paul Hervieu, and Max Jacob.

A New York Times writer in 1929 wrote that she was "one of the finest poets of present-day France."

She died in 1933 in Paris, aged 56, and was interred in the Père Lachaise Cemetery. She was a cousin of Prince Antoine Bibesco and Princess Marthe Bibesco.

In fine art
So popular was Anna de Noailles that various notable artists of the day painted her portrait, including Antonio de la Gandara, Ignacio Zuloaga, Kees van Dongen, Jacques Émile Blanche, and the British portrait painter Philip de László. In 1906 her image was sculpted by Auguste Rodin; the clay model can be seen today in the Musée Rodin in Paris, and the finished marble bust is on display in New York's Metropolitan Museum.

Awards
Anna de Noailles was the first woman to become a Commander of the Legion of Honor, the first woman to be received in the Royal Belgian Academy of French Language and Literature, and she was honored with the "Grand Prix" of the Académie Française in 1921.

Countess de Noailles served as a juror with Florence Meyer Blumenthal in awarding the Prix Blumenthal, a grant given between 1919–1954 to painters, sculptors, decorators, engravers, writers, and musicians.

Writings

Le Cœur innombrable (1901)
L'Ombre des jours  (1902)
La Nouvelle Espérance (1903)
Le Visage émerveillé (1904)
La Domination (1905)
Les Éblouissements (1907)
Les Vivants et les Morts (1913)
Les Forces éternelles (1920)
Les Innocentes, ou La Sagesse des femmes (1923)
Poème de l'amour (1924)
L'Honneur de souffrir (1927)
Exactitudes, Paris (1930)
Le Livre de ma vie (1932)
Derniers Vers et Poèmes d'enfance (1934)

See also
 Lesbian Poetry

References

External links

Website on Anna de Noailles, in both English and French
Anna de Noailles' Blog, in English
A Swiss blog on Anna de Noailles, in French
The Anna de Noailles Circle in France
Catalog of the Bibliothèque Nationale de France from which it is now possible to download Anna de Noailles' works for free

Poems by Anna de Noailles
The Anna de Noailles french school in Bucharest, Romania

1876 births
1933 deaths
Writers from Paris
French artists' models
Anne de Noailles
Princes Bibescu
Romanian princesses
Burials at Père Lachaise Cemetery
French nobility
French memoirists
French poets
French women novelists
French people of Greek descent
Commandeurs of the Légion d'honneur
French people of Romanian descent
Romanian women writers
Romanian writers
Romanian writers in French
Prix Blumenthal
French women memoirists
French women poets
Members of the Académie royale de langue et de littérature françaises de Belgique
French socialist feminists
20th-century memoirists
Romanian socialist feminists